Naseem Rajpar is a Pakistani politician who is the member of the Provincial Assembly of Sindh.

Personal life
Naseem was born in Khairpur located in Sindh province of Pakistan. She is married to Rafique Ahmed Rajpar and has two children. She lives in Karachi and has her permanent residence is in village Cheeho taluka located in Naushahro Feroze District.

Political career
Naseem was elected to the Provincial Assembly of Sindh as a candidate of Grand Democratic Alliance (GDA) on a reserved seat for women in consequence of 2018 Pakistani general election. She assumed the membership of the assembly on 13 August 2018.

References

Living people
Grand Democratic Alliance politicians
Politicians from Sindh
Sindhi people
Year of birth missing (living people)
Sindh MPAs 2018–2023